The Perth Sharks are an Australian junior ice hockey team based in Perth, Western Australia playing in the Australian Junior Ice Hockey League. They represent one of the two junior ice hockey teams from Western Australia currently playing in the AJIHL, which is the most elite level for ice hockey at a national level for ages between 16–20 years old.

Team history
Tryouts for the new Perth Sharks team began on 2 September 2014 with a mandatory fitness assessment, held on 2 September 2014 at Kingsway Christian College, and two ice sessions.

The Perth Sharks played their first Australian Junior Ice Hockey League game on Monday October 21, 2013 against the Perth Pelicans. The Sharks team included national draft players Remy McGuiness from South Australia, Anthony Barnes and Jordan Millen from Queensland.

Logo and uniform

2013-2014
The follow up season in the Australian Junior Ice Hockey League saw a lot of change via expansion and renaming of its existing teams. The changes were made in response to the National Hockey Leagues concern about the AJIHL using their team names and logos but also recognised the opportunity to create a new history for the teams through creating their own identity. In October 2013 the league expanded to six teams with two teams from Perth, the Sharks and the Pelicans, joining for the start of the 2013–14 season.

Players

Current roster
For the 2015–16 AJIHL season

Captains
 2013-14 
 2014-15 James Woodman (C), Tomek Sak (A), Alastair Punler (A)
 2015-16 Alastair Punler (C), Tomek Sak (A), Bruno Stolze (A)
 2016-17 Alastair Punler (C), Ryan Smyth (A), Jamie Campbell (A)

Head coaches
The first head coach for the Perth Sharks was Mike Johnston.

 2013-14 Mike Johnston
 2014-15 David Ruck
 2015-16 David Ruck
 2016-17 Markus Frankenberger

See also

Australian Junior Ice Hockey League
Melbourne Glaciers
Melbourne Whalers
Perth Pelicans
Sydney Sabres
Sydney Wolf Pack
Ice Hockey Australia
Ice Hockey New South Wales
Australian Women's Ice Hockey League
Australian Ice Hockey League
Jim Brown Trophy
Goodall Cup
Joan McKowen Memorial Trophy

References

Australian Junior Ice Hockey League
Ice hockey teams in Australia
Ice hockey clubs established in 2013
Sporting clubs in Perth, Western Australia
2013 establishments in Australia